Marcelino Correr (born 11 January 1932 in Piracicaba) was a Brazilian clergyman and bishop for the Roman Catholic Diocese of Carolina. He became ordained in 1957. He was appointed bishop in 1991. He died in 2006.

References

21st-century Roman Catholic bishops in Brazil
1932 births
2006 deaths
People from Piracicaba
20th-century Roman Catholic bishops in Brazil
Roman Catholic bishops of Carolina